Suvorov military canals (Suvorov canals) is a series of four open canals on Saimaa lake in Finland. The four canals of Kutvele, Käyhkää, Kukonharju and Telataipale are located in Puumala, Ruokolahti and Sulkava. They were built between 1791 and 1798 as part of the South-Eastern Finland fortification system and are the oldest canals in Finland. The canals are named after general Alexander Suvorov who ordered their construction.

Background

After the Russo-Swedish War (1741–1743) Sweden ceded the Lappeenranta fortress and Olavinlinna castle in Savonlinna to the Russian Empire in the Treaty of Åbo. The treaty divided Saimaa lake in two, with Sweden controlling the strait of Puumala and requiring toll payments from water traffic between Savonlinna and Lappeenranta and denying military traffic altogether. After the Russo-Swedish War (1788–1790) Russia began to improve the defences in Finland by building the South-Eastern Finland fortification system. The war had also showed the importance of Saimaa water ways and as part of the fortification system it was decided to construct a series of canals to bypass Puumala.

Construction

Construction of Kutvele, Käyhkää and Telataipale canals began in fall 1791 under Ivan Laube. Construction of Kukonharju canal began later in 1794. The smaller canals had some 300 men working in their construction while the larger Kukonharju canal had around one thousand men. Kukonharju and Kutvele canals were finished in 1796 and Käyhkää and Telataipale in 1798.

The canals are built from stone supported by logs. The canal entrances had prepared blockades from logs and chains as a preparation for a possible enemy attack. Canal entrances also had stone obstacles to prevent anyone who was not familiar with them from navigating safely through them. All canals were open canals with no locks and were simply built across isthmuses. They also had a military guard post, with Kukonharju canal also having a larger garrison.

Military use

Suvorov military canals were used by the Russian Saimaa flotilla that had its bases in Lappeenranta and Savonlinna and in the smaller Kärnäkoski Fortress. The flotilla, along with the military canals and the entire South-Eastern Finland fortification system, lost their importance only a decade later as the result of the Finnish War between 1808 and 1809 when Sweden ceded the entire Finland to Russia. The Russian Saimaa flotilla was disbanded in 1810 and in 1816 the responsibility for the canals was transferred to civilian authorities and the use of the canals dwindled to local inhabitants.

Present day condition

Kutvele canal was enlarged twice during 20th century and nothing of the original construction remains. In contrast the other three canals spent 200 years almost untouched from early 19th century until 2003, when Finnish National Board of Antiquities began restoration works on them. Now they have been turned into tourist attractions.

The canals

Kutvele

  Kutvele canal is located on the border of Taipalsaari and Ruokolahti. The canal has been enlarged for shipping and nothing of the original construction remains.

Käyhkää

A bridge was built over the canal already during the time of Suvorov. The modern bridge is not original but is located on the same spot. An original toll post building is preserved until today and is now used as resort. Archeological excavation located remnants of a boat carrying stones from 1790s.

Kukonharju

It is located on the border of Ruokolahti and Puumala and was built partly through a rock crest. Kukonharju had the largest garrison of the canals and was used as a border strongpoint.

Telataipale

  Telataipale is located in Sulkava and is the northernmost of the canals.

References

External links

Short introduction to Suvorov canals in English
Telataipale canal
Agricolan tietosanomat article

Canals in Finland
Saimaa
Military history of Russia
Canals opened in 1796
Canals opened in 1798
1796 establishments in the Russian Empire
Alexander Suvorov